Serbian Patriarch Pavle I (1527–1541) was the Archbishop of Peć and self-proclaimed Serbian Patriarch from around 1530 to 1541. He tried to end the long period of vacancy of the Serbian Patriarchal Throne, with limited and temporary success.

Biography
As the Metropolitan of Smederevo, he managed with the help of notable Serbs and some Ottoman officials to take control over the Archiepiscopal see of Peć, and worked toward its renewed autocephaly, recreating the Serbian Patriarchate of Peć that had been vacant since 1463 and formally abolished by the Ottomans, who transferred all Serbian eparchies to the jurisdiction of the Archbishopric of Ohrid.

Most of the higher clergy, however, supported the Archbishop Prohor of Ohrid, and on the Church assembly on 13 March 1532 anathematized Pavle and his followers. After some time Pavle made peace with Prohor, and recognized his supreme jurisdiction, but later began a more active struggle for removing Peć from the jurisdiction of Ohrid. He successfully had Prohor and his closest people imprisoned by the Ottoman government, and had unreliable bishops removed and began reorganizing Serbian Orthodox Church, proclaiming himself Serbian Patriarch.

Prohor managed to free himself and after talks with the Sultan was reappointed as Archbishopric of Ohrid. Upon Prohor's return, an assembly was summoned on 20 July 1541 which stripped Pavle of his titles and priesthood, along with bishop Neofit of Lesnovo, Teofan of Zvornik and Pahomije of Kratovo, all of whom Pavle had appointed – those who still recognized them as their bishops were to be anathematized. After this, Pavle went into exile.

References

Sources

External links
 Official site of the Serbian Orthodox Church: Serbian Archbishops and Patriarchs

16th-century Serbian people
16th-century Eastern Orthodox bishops
16th-century Eastern Orthodox archbishops
Bishops of the Serbian Orthodox Church
People from Smederevo
Serbs from the Ottoman Empire
Clergy removed from office
16th-century people from the Ottoman Empire